Scrobipalpa cretigena is a moth in the family Gelechiidae. It was described by Edward Meyrick in 1914. It is found in South Africa.

The forewings and hindwings are ochreous whitish.

References

Endemic moths of South Africa
Scrobipalpa
Moths described in 1914